Jordan Christopher Mabin (born October 31, 1988) is an American football cornerback who is currently a free agent. He has also been a member of the Cleveland Browns, Baltimore Ravens, Atlanta Falcons and the Montreal Alouettes of the Canadian Football League.

High school career
Mabin attended Nordonia High School in Macedonia, Ohio, where he played both defensive back and running back. Offensively, he rushed for 6,700 career yards, including 2,354 yards his senior year, on 869 attempts (7.7 ypc), which is the sixth-best career mark in Ohio high school history. Defensively, totaled 143 career tackles (123 solos) and 11 interceptions.

Considered a three-star recruit by Rivals.com, Mabin was listed as the No. 27 cornerback prospect in the nation in 2007.

College career
After redshirting his initial year at Northwestern, Mabin started the last 11 games at cornerback for the Wildcats in 2008. He finished with 52 total tackles and three interceptions for the year. Mabin subsequently earned multiple All-Freshman honors, as he was named to FWAA′s Freshman All-America team  and Sporting News′ Freshman All-American team.

Professional career

Baltimore Ravens
Mabin signed with the Baltimore Ravens as an Undrafted Free Agent. Mabin was later released from the Ravens preseason roster cuts on August 26.  Then in mid-October he joined the Ravens' practice squad.

Montreal Alouettes
Was signed to the practice roster of the Montreal Alouettes of the Canadian Football League for two regular season games.

Cleveland Browns
Mabin signed with the Cleveland Browns on December 26, 2012.

Second stint with the Alouettes
On March 27, 2013 Mabin signed with the Alouettes

Atlanta Falcons
On August 1, 2013, Mabin signed with the Atlanta Falcons.
He was cut on August 30, 2014. He signed to the practice squad on December 12, 2014. He was released by the Falcons on May 1, 2015.

San Diego Chargers
On August 4, 2015, the San Diego Chargers signed Mabin after waiving WR Demetrius Wilson. On September 5, 2015, he was waived by the Chargers.

Footnotes

External links
Official biography at Northwestern

1988 births
Living people
People from Macedonia, Ohio
American football cornerbacks
Northwestern Wildcats football players
Baltimore Ravens players
Montreal Alouettes players
Cleveland Browns players
Atlanta Falcons players
San Diego Chargers players